Dear Enemy may refer to:
Dear Enemy (band), an indie pop band
Dear Enemy (film), a 2011 Chinese film
Dear Enemy (novel), a novel by Jean Webster
 "Dear Enemy", a 1971 episode of the television series Hawaii Five-O

See also
Dear enemy effect
Dearest Enemy, a 1925 musical by Rodgers and Hart and Herbert Fields